Ruth Helena Sinnott (née Kellogg; February 14, 1823 – May 29, 1897) was a Union nurse during the American Civil War.

Early life 
Ruth Helena Kellogg was born February 14, 1823, in Manlius, New York, the daughter of Philo Kellogg and Nancy A. Riley Kellogg. She married Jonathan Patrick Sinnotte in 1848; they had two children together, Millard and Nancy, both born in Ohio. Ruth Sinnotte became a young widow with two small children when Jonathan Sinnotte died in 1852. She moved with her son and daughter to Peoria, Illinois.

Civil War Service 
Sinnotte was commissioned in St. Louis, Missouri to serve on the steamer Imperial, traveling between Pittsburgh Landing and St. Louis. When this ship was out of service, Sinnotte then went to the steamer Ella until this steamer too was out of service. She then was transferred to Monterey, Tennessee, to service in the hospital at Corith. Her service here, however, was cut short by illness, causing her to return home to Illinois.

Soon, she was traveling again, this time with the 113th Illinois Infantry, to Memphis where she served on the Vicksburg fleet, once again on the Imperial.

Later years 
Ruth Sinnotte died in Lexington, Kansas on May 29, 1897, aged 74 years.

References

External links 

 

Women in the American Civil War
1823 births
1897 deaths
People from Manlius, New York
American Civil War nurses
American women nurses